Beverly Lorraine Greene (October 4, 1915 – August 22, 1957), was an American architect. According to architectural editor Dreck Spurlock Wilson, she was "believed to have been the first African-American female licensed as an architect in the United States." She was registered as an architect in Illinois in 1942.

Biography
Beverly Lorraine Greene was born on October 4, 1915, to attorney James A. Greene and his wife Vera of Chicago, Illinois. The family was of African-American heritage. She had no brothers or sisters. She attended the racially integrated University of Illinois at Urbana–Champaign (UIUC), graduating with a bachelor's degree in architectural engineering in 1936, the first African-American woman to earn this degree from the university. A year later she earned a master in city planning and housing. She was also involved in the drama club Cenacle and was a member of the American Society of Civil Engineers. The following year, she earned her master's degree from UIUC in city planning and housing.

After graduation, she returned to Chicago and worked for Kenneth Roderick O'Neal's architecture firm in 1937, the first architectural office led by an African American in downtown Chicago, before she was hired by the Housing Authority in 1938. She became the first licensed African-American woman architect in the United States when she registered with the State of Illinois on December 28, 1942. Despite her credentials, she found it difficult to surmount race barriers to find work in the city. She and other black architects were routinely ignored by the mainstream Chicago press.

A 1945 newspaper report about the Metropolitan Life Insurance Company's development project at Stuyvesant Town led Greene to move to New York City. She submitted her application to help design it, in spite of the developer's racially segregated housing plans; and much to her surprise, she was hired. After only a few days, she quit the project to accept a scholarship for the master's degree program at Columbia University. She obtained the degree in architecture in 1945 and took a job with the firm of Isadore Rosefield. Rosefield's firm primarily designed health facilities. Though she remained in Rosefield's employ until 1955, Greene worked with Edward Durell Stone on at least two projects in the early 1950s. In 1951, she was involved with the project to build the theater at the University of Arkansas and in 1952, she helped plan the Arts Complex at Sarah Lawrence College. After 1955, she worked with Marcel Breuer, assisting on designs for the UNESCO United Nations Headquarters in Paris and some of the buildings for the University Heights Campus of New York University, though both of those projects were completed after Greene's death.

She died on August 22, 1957, in New York City, aged 41. Her memorial service took place at the Unity Funeral Home in Manhattan, one of the buildings she had designed.

Projects 
with Marcel Breuer

 Grosse Point Public Library, Grosse Point, Mich., 1951
 Winthrop House Rockefeller addition, Tarrytown, N.Y., 1952
 UNESCO Headquarters, Secretariat and Conference Hall, Place de Fontenoy, Paris, 1954–57
 New York University Building Complex, University Heights campus, Bronx, N.Y., 1956

See also 
 African-American architects

References

Sources

External links 
Pioneering Women of American Architecture, Beverly Lorraine Greene
“IAWA Biographical Database.” Accessed October 15, 2021. https://iawadb.lib.vt.edu/search.php?searchTerm=g. 
Helgeson, Jeffrey. Crucibles of Black Empowerment. Chicago: The University of Chicago Press, 2014.

1915 births
1957 deaths
20th-century African-American artists
20th-century African-American women
20th-century African-American people
20th-century American architects
African-American architects
American women architects
Columbia Graduate School of Architecture, Planning and Preservation alumni
People from Chicago
University of Illinois School of Architecture alumni